The Gods of Earth and Heaven is Swedish band Army of Lovers' third studio album. It was the first album, after the replacement of La Camilla by Michaela de la Cour and the introduction of new member Dominika Peczynski. It contains the hit singles "Israelism" and "La Plage de Saint Tropez". "Israelism" was banned from MTV for allegedly making fun of Jewish culture (despite the fact that two of the band members were Jewish). The album didn't do as well as Massive Luxury Overdose did. Album charted 20 weeks and peaked at number 8 in Finnish Albums Chart Top-40. In the end of June 1993, Army of Lovers performed in several TV shows in France, Spain and Italy.

The first single released from the album, "Israelism", is about Jean-Pierre Barda's way back to his Jewish culture and history.

Critical reception
Alan Jones from Music Week wrote, "Myriad Influences — opera, cabaret, Hi-NRG, classical, pop and rap to name but a few — collide in a way that will endear few on The Gods of Earth and Heaven. The camp Swedish-based group's single "Israelism" has attracted some attention, but this album you order at your peril."

Track listing

Credits
Choir [The Army Tabernacle Choir Features] – The 69 Caruso, Erika Essen-Möller, Lilling Palmeklint, Malin Bäckström, Ricco (3) 
Coordinator [Promotion] – Jonas Holst 
Directed By [Video Clips] – Fredrik Boklund 
Engineer, Programmed By [Additional] – Per Adebratt 
Executive-Producer – Ola Håkansson 
Film Producer [Video Clips] – Martin Persson 
Keyboards, Programmed By, Guitar – Anders Wollbeck 
Management – Anders Bladh 
Mastered By – Björn Engelman 
Producer, Mixed By – Alexander Bard, Anders Wollbeck, Per Adebratt
Supervised By [Project Supervisor] – Eric Hasselqvist 
Vocals, Bass – Dominika Peczynski 
Vocals, Drums – Jean-Pierre Barda 
Vocals, Guitar – Alexander Bard 
Vocals, Keyboards – Michaela de la Cour

Charts

References
 

1993 albums
Army of Lovers albums
Stockholm Records albums